Alexander Francis Vei Chen Lee (born January 15, 1990), known as Alex Lee, is a Guamanian international footballer who currently plays for Christos FC. Alex is sometimes referred to by his nickname "A-Lee.”

Club career

College
Lee played college soccer at the University of Maryland, College Park between 2008 and 2011. Lee missed the majority of his sophomore year in 2009 season due to injury from a car accident.

While at college, Lee played for USL PDL club Real Maryland Monarchs during their 2011 season.

Professional
Lee was selected by FC Dallas with the 11th pick in the first round of the 2012 MLS Supplemental Draft. He signed with Dallas on March 13, 2012. Lee failed to appear with Dallas during their 2012 season and was released at the end of the season.

Lee signed with USL Pro club Richmond Kickers on March 5, 2013.

Personal life
Lee has two brothers; a twin, Justin and a younger brother, Nate, who have both also represented Guam at international level. All three made their debut in the same game against Hong Kong.

References

External links
 

American soccer players
Guamanian footballers
Guam international footballers
Maryland Terrapins men's soccer players
Real Maryland F.C. players
FC Dallas players
Richmond Kickers players
Sportspeople from Rockville, Maryland
Soccer players from Maryland
USL League Two players
USL Championship players
FC Dallas draft picks
1990 births
Living people
American twins
Twin sportspeople
Association football defenders